Televizier was a Dutch professional cycling team that existed in part from 1961 to 1967. It was sponsored by Dutch television listings magazine Televizier.

Rosters

1961

References

External links

Defunct cycling teams based in the Netherlands
Cycling teams based in the Netherlands
Cycling teams established in 1961
Cycling teams established in 1964
Cycling teams disestablished in 1967